Srinivasa Kalyanam may refer to:
 Srinivasa Kalyanam (1987 film), a 1987 Telugu-language film
 Srinivasa Kalyanam (2018 film), a 2018 Telugu-language film

See also 
 Srinivasa Kalyana, a 2017 Kannada-language film